Unleashed is the fourth studio album by American country music singer-songwriter Mark Collie. It was released in 1994.

The first single from the record, called "It Is No Secret", missed the Top 40 entirely, but the next single, called "Hard Lovin' Woman" peaked at number 13.

It is notable for being his last record before Collie switched to Giant Records, a subsidiary of Warner Bros. Records, that same year.

Critical reception

Brian Mansfield of AllMusic rated the album 3 out of 5 stars, saying that it "continued in the vein of Mark Collie."

Track listing

Production
Produced By Don Cook
Recorded & Mixed By Mark J. Capps
Mastered By Hank Williams

Personnel
Deborah Allen – background vocals on "Lonely Streak"
Robert Bailey – background vocals
Bruce Bouton – steel guitar on "Lonely Streak"
Mark J. Capps – electric guitar on "Ring of Fire"
Carlene Carter – vocals on "Ring Of Fire"
Mark Casstevens – acoustic guitar
Mark Collie – lead vocals, acoustic guitar
Paul Franklin – steel guitar
Rob Hajacos – fiddle
James House – vocals on "All I Want Is You"
John Barlow Jarvis – piano, synthesizer, Hammond B-3 organ
Lorelei McBroom – background vocals
Brent Mason – electric guitar
John Wesley Ryles – background vocals
Suzy Willis – background vocals
Dennis Wilson – background vocals
Lonnie Wilson – drums, percussion
Glenn Worf – bass guitar, upright bass

The Nashville String Machine: Carl Gorodetzky, Pam Sixfin, Lee Larrison, Ted Madsen, Conni Ellisor, Alan Umstead, Dave Davidson, Mary K. Vanosdale, Bob Mason, John Catchings
Strings Arranged By Dennis Burnside

References
Liner Notes: Mark Collie-Unleashed, CD. 1994, MCA Records

1994 albums
Mark Collie albums
MCA Records albums
Albums produced by Don Cook